Soviet occupation of Latvia can refer to: 

Soviet occupation of Latvia in 1940
Soviet re-occupation of Latvia in 1944
Latvian Soviet Socialist Republic (1945-1990)